Irving Dale Fryar, Sr. (born September 28, 1962) is an American former professional football player who was a wide receiver in the National Football League (NFL) for seventeen seasons.  Fryar played college football for the University of Nebraska, and was recognized as an All-American.  He was selected with the first overall pick of the 1984 NFL Draft, becoming the second wide receiver to be taken number one overall, the first being Dave Parks in 1964. Fryar played professionally for the New England Patriots, Miami Dolphins, Philadelphia Eagles, and Washington Redskins of the NFL.  Known for his longevity, his best seasons statistically came well into his 30s, at a time when many receivers are on the tail end of their careers, and he played for 17 seasons, retiring at the age of 39 holding several NFL longevity records for receivers.  Following his NFL career, he was convicted of mortgage fraud.

Early years

Fryar grew up in Mount Holly Township, New Jersey, and played high school football at Rancocas Valley Regional High School.

College career
An All-American for the University of Nebraska in 1983, Fryar played alongside Heisman Trophy winner Mike Rozier (running back) and Heisman finalist Turner Gill (quarterback).

Statistics

Professional career
Fryar was the second wide receiver to be drafted first overall in the NFL Draft when the New England Patriots made him the top selection of the 1984 NFL Draft.

With the Patriots, Fryar saw success on a receiving corps that featured Stephen Starring and perennial Pro Bowler Stanley Morgan.  He also served as the team's primary punt returner. Following the 1985 season, in which Fryar was named to his first Pro Bowl, he played in Super Bowl XX, where he scored New England's only touchdown in their 46–10 loss to the Chicago Bears. He was one of the few marquee players on the 1–15 1990 team, and in 1991 he had his first 1000-yard receiving season.  Traded to the Dolphins in 1993 for a pair of high-round draft picks, he made an immediate impact, having two further 1000-yard seasons in 1993 and 1994, and making the Pro Bowl both years.  Following the 1995 season, he signed as a free agent with the Eagles, with whom he played in a fourth and fifth Pro Bowl following the 1996 and 1997 seasons.  After retiring from football briefly following the 1998 season, he was signed by the Redskins, with whom he played the final two seasons of his career.
  
Fryar retired from the NFL in 2001 after completing 17 NFL seasons.  During that time, he caught 851 passes for 12,785 yards and 84 touchdowns, along with one rushing and three punt return touchdowns.  He also gained 242 rushing yards, 2,055 yards returning punts, 505 yards on kickoff returns, and 7 fumble return yards, giving him 15,594 all-purpose yards.

Fryar's 255 played games are the most ever for a New Jersey-born player.

Personal life
Fryar has had several off-field incidents during and after his career. In 1985, he missed the AFC championship game after injuring his hand in a domestic dispute with his pregnant wife. He was arrested in 1988 on weapons charges after a New Jersey state trooper found a loaded shotgun and handgun and a hunting knife in Fryar's car.

On November 23, 1986, Fryar separated his shoulder during a game against the Buffalo Bills. Instead of watching the rest of the game from the sidelines, Fryar left the stadium and was listening to the game while driving his car through Foxboro. He crashed into a tree and suffered a slight concussion.

His wife filed for divorce in 2014 after 29 years of marriage. They have four children.

On August 7, 2015, Fryar and his mother, Allene McGhee, were found guilty of conspiring to defraud six banks and a mortgage company by a New Jersey Superior Court jury. The prosecution maintained that Fryar and McGhee conspired with real estate consultant William Barksdale in a scheme to fraudulently obtain six home-equity loans totaling about $850,000 in November and December 2009, and a $414,000 mortgage in October 2009, using McGhee's home as collateral in each instance. Fryar and McGhee maintain they were victims of Barksdale, who is serving a 20-month sentence in federal prison for conspiracy to commit wire fraud for his role in the scheme, and plan to appeal.

Fryar's son, Londen, was signed by the New York Giants as an undrafted free agent in 2009 out of Western Michigan University.

On October 2, 2015, Pro Football Talk reported that Fryar and his mother were convicted of mortgage fraud.  Fryar will receive a five-year prison sentence while his mother will receive probation.  According to the New Jersey AG who oversaw the case, John Hoffman,  "The fact that Fryar had the means to succeed and do good things and instead chose this criminal path makes his actions all the more reprehensible".

On December 7, 2015, a NJ Judge handed up an order that Irving Fryar and his mother to pay $615,600 in restitution to five lending institutions that were cheated in a mortgage scam. Fryar and his mother, Allene McGhee, were convicted of applying for multiple mortgage loans in quick succession while using the same property as collateral. Fryar was sentenced in October to five years in prison while his mother received three years of probation.  In June 2016, Fryar was released from prison after serving eight months of his sentence. He was placed under the state's Supervision Program for non-violent offenders.

NFL records
 Touchdown receptions from 19 different passers
 First player to record a touchdown in 17 consecutive seasons (1984–2000) - (broken by Jerry Rice who ended up with 20 consecutive seasons with a touchdown reception)
 Oldest player to score 4 touchdowns (all receptions) in a single game (October 20, 1996) - 34 years, 22 days
 Third most receiving yards in a half - 211 (2nd half, September 4, 1994)

References

External links

Irving Fryar at databasefootball.com

1962 births
Living people
African-American players of American football
All-American college football players
American Conference Pro Bowl players
American football return specialists
American football wide receivers
American Christian clergy
Miami Dolphins players
National Football League first-overall draft picks
National Conference Pro Bowl players
Nebraska Cornhuskers football players
New England Patriots players
People from Mount Holly, New Jersey
People from Springfield Township, Burlington County, New Jersey
Philadelphia Eagles players
Players of American football from New Jersey
Rancocas Valley Regional High School alumni
Sportspeople from Burlington County, New Jersey
Washington Redskins players
American sportspeople convicted of crimes
21st-century African-American people
20th-century African-American sportspeople
10,000 receiving yards club
Ed Block Courage Award recipients